(born 27 July 1978 in Sōka, Saitama, Japan) is a Japanese swimmer who competed in the 1992, 2000, and 2004 Summer Olympics.

Inada retired after the 2004 Summer Olympics, though she joined the Phoenix Swim Club in 2008 and attempted to make a professional comeback in April 2010. In April 2012, she placed 3rd in the 100m backstroke in the Japan Championship, just missing out on a top 2 spot required for attending the 2012 Summer Olympics. 2014 saw her break three world records in the 35-39 age group at the 2014 FINA World Masters Championships. In 2015, she won the Japan Championship in the 50m backstroke time with a time of 28.36s, and placed second in the 100m backstroke with a time of 1m 1.27s. In 2017, she is still with the Phoenix Swim Club, as an assistant coach.

References

1978 births
Living people
Japanese female backstroke swimmers
Olympic swimmers of Japan
Swimmers at the 1992 Summer Olympics
Swimmers at the 2000 Summer Olympics
Swimmers at the 2004 Summer Olympics
Asian Games medalists in swimming
Swimmers at the 2002 Asian Games
Asian Games silver medalists for Japan
Medalists at the 2002 Asian Games
Universiade medalists in swimming
Universiade gold medalists for Japan
Universiade silver medalists for Japan
Medalists at the 1997 Summer Universiade
Medalists at the 1999 Summer Universiade
20th-century Japanese women
21st-century Japanese women